The Stroud News & Journal is a weekly paid-for newspaper based in Stroud, Gloucestershire. It is published every Wednesday in a tabloid format by Newsquest and covers a large portion of the Stroud district, including the towns of Stroud, Minchinhampton, Nailsworth, Stonehouse, Painswick  and Chalford, and their surrounding villages.

History

The SNJ, as it often refers to itself in print, was amalgamated in 1957 from the Stroud News and the Stroud Journal.

Demographics and statistics
The SNJ has a circulation of ppl around 10,000 weekly copies, as circulation has dropped by 25-30% pa. Since the last audited number of 19,000 in 2004  ABC statistics indicate a readership of 46,880 roughly 2.5 readers per copy, with the readership split evenly between the socio-economic groups and age ranges.

References

External links

Stroud District
Newspapers published in Gloucestershire
Newspapers published by Newsquest
Publications established in 1957
1957 establishments in England